Vladimir Vasilyevich Kobzev (29 November 1959 – 7 August 2012) was a Russian professional football coach and player.

Club career
He made his professional debut in the Soviet Second League in 1979 for FC Dinamo Barnaul. He played 5 games and scored 1 goal in the European Cup Winners' Cup 1986–87 for FC Torpedo Moscow.

Honours
 Soviet Top League bronze: 1988.
 Soviet Cup winner: 1986.
 Soviet Cup finalist: 1988, 1989 (played in the early stages of the 1988/89 tournament for FC Torpedo Moscow).

References

1959 births
2012 deaths
Sportspeople from Barnaul
Soviet footballers
Russian footballers
Association football forwards
Soviet Top League players
Russian Premier League players
Russian football managers
FC Dynamo Barnaul players
PFC Krylia Sovetov Samara players
FC Dynamo Moscow players
FC Kuban Krasnodar players
FC Torpedo Moscow players
FC Rostov players
Pakhtakor Tashkent FK players
Polonia Warsaw players
FC KAMAZ Naberezhnye Chelny players
Russian expatriate footballers
Expatriate footballers in Poland
Russian expatriate sportspeople in Poland